Emebert was an early Bishop of Cambrai, often identified with Bishop Ablebert of Cambrai (early 8th century). 

According to the unreliable Vita S. Amalbergae viduae, Emebert was the son of Duke Witger of Lotharingia and Saint Amalberga of Maubeuge. His siblings include four other saints, Ermelinde, Gudula, Pharaildis and the martyred Reineldis, beheaded during an invasion by the Huns.

Emebert was possibly a missionary bishop who evangelized Brabant, his native country.

According to the Gesta Episcoporum Cameracensis (Acts of the Bishops of Cambrai), he was buried in a place called Ham, located in the vicinity of Cambrai. His body was afterwards taken to Maubeuge Abbey, where his mother had become a nun.

His feast day is celebrated on the 15 January. He is particularlary venerated at Arras, Cambrai and Ghent.

References

Sources
 Gesta Ableberti: Bollandus J., Henschenius G., 'De S. Ableberto, sive Emeberto, episcopo Cameracensi et Atrebatensi', Acta Sanctorum Januarii Tomus I (1643) 1077–1080.
 Holweck, F. G., A Biographical Dictionary of the Saints. St. Louis, MO: B. Herder Book Co. 1924.

Year of birth missing
8th-century Frankish bishops
8th-century Frankish saints
Burials at Maubeuge Abbey
710 deaths
Bishops of Cambrai